Carne or Carné is a surname (occasionally a given name), and may refer to

Given name
 Carne Ross, British diplomat

Surname
 Sir Edward Carne (c.1500–61), Welsh scholar, diplomat, English M.P.
 Elizabeth Catherine Thomas Carne (1817–73), English author & natural philosopher
 James Carne (1906–86), English Army officer
 Jean Carn(e) (b. 1947), US singer
 John Carne (1789–1844), English traveller & author
 Joseph Carne (1782–1852), English geologist & industrialist
 Joseph Edmund Carne (1855–1922), Australian geologist
 Judy Carne (1939–2015), English actor
 Marcel Carné (1906–96), French film director
 Marcelo Carné (born 1991), Brazilian footballer
 Marine de Carné de Trécesson de Coëtlogon (b. fl.1985), French diplomat 
 Rafael Saborido Carné, or Rafael Saborido i Carné (1927—2008), Spanish chess player
 Stuart Carne (b. 1926), English doctor
 Warren Carne (b. 1975), Zimbabwean mountain-biker
 Willie Carne (b. 1969), Australian rugby league footballer

See also
Carne, Cornwall, a settlement
Carne, Phoenicia, an ancient Phoenician city
Carne asada, chili con carne and other phrases from carne meaning meat in Spanish, Portuguese, Italian, Romanian
Carnes
Carney (disambiguation)
Calne
Carne, a 1968 film directed by Armando Bó starring Isabel Sarli
Carne, a 1991 film directed by Gaspar Noé